Seyfabad (also Romanized as Seyfābād and Saifābād; also known as Şafīābād) is a village in Qareh Chay Rural District, in the Central District of Saveh County, Markazi Province, Iran. At the 2006 census, its population was 426, in 97 families.

References 

Populated places in Saveh County